Marianne Reiter is an Austrian para-alpine skier. She represented Austria at the 1984 Winter Paralympics in Innsbruck, Austria.

She won one gold medal and one silver medal.

Achievements

See also 
 List of Paralympic medalists in alpine skiing

References 

Living people
Year of birth missing (living people)
Place of birth missing (living people)
Paralympic alpine skiers of Austria
Austrian female alpine skiers
Alpine skiers at the 1984 Winter Paralympics
Medalists at the 1984 Winter Paralympics
Paralympic silver medalists for Austria
Paralympic gold medalists for Austria
Paralympic medalists in alpine skiing
Austrian amputees
20th-century Austrian women
21st-century Austrian women